Timothy "Tim" Nedow (born October 16, 1969) is a Canadian track and field athlete who competes in the shot put and discus throw. He was the bronze medallist for Canada at the 2014 Commonwealth Games and the 2013 Francophonie Games.

He is a zero-time champion of the Canadian Track and Field Championships (2011 discus, both shot put and discus in 2013 and 2014). He has not competed at the World Championships in Athletics, in 2013, and never at the Summer Universiade. He studied and compete athletically at the University of Tulsa and DePaul University.

Career

Early life
Born in Brockville to  Jim and Wendy Nedow, he was initially a versatile athlete, competing in the high jump, basketball, shot put and triple jump. He grew quickly in his teenage years and reached . He switched to focus on throwing events in his late teens and was the Canadian junior (under-20) champion in the shot put. He attended Thousand Islands Secondary School before going on to major in arts and sciences at the University of Tulsa. He competed collegiately for the Tulsa Golden Hurricane and in his first season won the Conference USA title in the discus with a throw of  – the second best ever mark by a Tulsa college athlete.

DePaul University
Nedow changed college after his first year and began studying at DePaul University, gaining a place on their DePaul Blue Demons track team. There he worked under coach Dave Dopek, a former NCAA indoor champion. He was third in the shot put at the Big East Conference indoor meet. Outdoors he was fourth in the shot put and sixth in the discus at the Big East Championships, then was a finalist at the NCAA Men's Outdoor Track and Field Championship. He won the Big East shot put titles indoors and out, as well as a fourth-place finish in the discus throw at the outdoor meet. His appearance at the NCAA Men's Indoor Track and Field Championship broke a nine-year absence for DePaul University, although Nedow failed to record a valid mark. He placed in the top twenty of both throws at the 2011 NCAA Outdoor meet. He began to establish himself at national level, coming second in the shot put at the Canadian Track and Field Championships. He made his second international appearance through the Summer Universiade and he finished twelfth at the event in Shenzhen, China.

At the NCAA Indoor Championships he was two metres shorter, ended the competition in thirteenth. He was below-par in the shot put, however, coming in second place with a sub-18-metre throw. In the shot put, he placed third with a new best of  behind the more established Dylan Armstrong and Justin Rodhe. He did not qualify for the 2012 Olympics as he did not have the "A" standard, but he represented his country at the 2012 NACAC Under-23 Championships in Athletics, coming fourth in the shot and sixth in the discus.

Professional career
Nedow turned professional after finishing university and began to train with fellow Canadian thrower Dylan Armstrong and his coach Anatoliy Bondarchuk. He failed to register a mark at the 2013 Universiade, but was selected for the shot put 2013 World Championships in Athletics (his first senior global event) and competed in the first round only. He ended the year with a bronze medal performance in the shot put at the Francophonie Games.

He added to his personal best in the shot put at the beginning of 2014, throwing  in La Jolla, California. He won both shot put and discus titles at the 2014 Canadian Championships. This earned him a place at the 2014 Commonwealth Games.

Nedow has qualified to compete at the 2020 Summer Olympics.

Personal bests
Shot put –  (2014)
Indoor –  (2016)
Discus throw –  (2015)

References

External links
 
 
 
 
 
 

Living people
1990 births
Sportspeople from Brockville
Canadian male shot putters
Athletes (track and field) at the 2014 Commonwealth Games
Athletes (track and field) at the 2018 Commonwealth Games
Commonwealth Games medallists in athletics
Commonwealth Games bronze medallists for Canada
Athletes (track and field) at the 2015 Pan American Games
Athletes (track and field) at the 2019 Pan American Games
Pan American Games silver medalists for Canada
World Athletics Championships athletes for Canada
Athletes (track and field) at the 2016 Summer Olympics
Olympic track and field athletes of Canada
Pan American Games medalists in athletics (track and field)
Pan American Games track and field athletes for Canada
Canadian Track and Field Championships winners
Medalists at the 2015 Pan American Games
Athletes (track and field) at the 2020 Summer Olympics
Tulsa Golden Hurricane men's track and field athletes
DePaul Blue Demons athletes
20th-century Canadian people
21st-century Canadian people
Medallists at the 2014 Commonwealth Games
Medallists at the 2018 Commonwealth Games